Lake Tarpon is a freshwater lake located about  west of Tampa in Palm Harbor and Tarpon Springs, Florida.
Its watershed encompasses . Its two largest tributaries are South Creek and Brooker Creek.
The lake is a regional recreational destination and is renowned for its largemouth bass fishing.

Although Lake Tarpon is designated as a fishing lake, it fails to meet the EPA's standards, and is therefore listed as an impaired lake due to its excessive nutrients and resulting low dissolved oxygen levels. The lake underwent increasing eutrophication during the 1990s, following a large algal bloom in 1987. Although initial studies determined that the lake was not polluted, studies in the following years noted a decline in the lake's water quality.

References

External links
 Lake Tarpon Information Center (laketarpon.org)
 Lake Tarpon Monster (laketarponmonster.com)

Lakes of Florida
Lakes of Pinellas County, Florida